Aadyathe Kanmani is a 1995 Indian Malayalam-language family drama film directed by Rajasenan.

Plot
Balachandran Unnithan (Jayaram) is a singer who falls in love with Ambika(Sudha Rani), a singer from his own troupe and they both get married. Balachandran's family longs for a male child to inherit the family's wealth, but his elder brothers have only female children. When Ambika becomes pregnant, Balachandran realizes that his wife is carrying a daughter, and not a son.

Later, he meets his old classmate and best friend, Padmarajan, whose wife Hema is also pregnant, bearing a male child. However, their babies are swapped by mistake by Balu's mother soon after the delivery. Both Padmarajan and Balu must keep this as a secret to see their children. When Balu's relatives discover this, the babies get kidnapped by the antagonists.

Cast
Jayaram as Balachandran Unnithan
Sudha Rani as Ambika (as Sudha)
Biju Menon as Padmarajan
Chippy as Hema
K. P. A. C. Lalitha as Malavika (Balachandran's mother)
Janardhanan as Unnithan (Balachandran's father)
Jagathy Sreekumar as Sreedharan Unnithan (Balachandran's eldest brother)
Maniyanpilla Raju as Dineshan Unnithan (Balachandran's older brother)
Kanakalatha as Kousalya (Sreedharan's wife) 
Priyanka as Usha (Dineshan's wife)
V. K. Sreeraman as Divakaran (Usha's father)
Indrans as Narayanankutty
Sathaar as Nambiathiri
 Babu Namboothiri as Raghavan Nair (Ambika's father)
K.T.S. Padannayil as Malavika's father and Balachandran's grandfather
Prem Kumar as Urumees
Reshmi Soman as Ambika's sister
Kottayam Santha as Koushalya's mother
Sindhu Jacob as Hema's servant

Remakes

Box office
The film was commercial success.

References

External links

1990s Malayalam-language films
Malayalam films remade in other languages
1995 comedy films
1995 films
Indian comedy films
Films directed by Rajasenan
Films shot in Thrissur